Chestnut Ridge is a historic home located at Aberdeen, Harford County, Maryland.  It is a two-story brick dwelling built about 1810, with an earlier frame wing.  It features vernacular Federal woodwork which remains substantially intact, and Greek Revival trim.  The property also includes a stone springhouse and the site of an 18th-century mill.

It was listed on the National Register of Historic Places in 1983.

References

External links
, including photo from 1983, Maryland Historical Trust

Houses in Harford County, Maryland
Houses on the National Register of Historic Places in Maryland
Houses completed in 1810
Federal architecture in Maryland
Greek Revival houses in Maryland
Aberdeen, Maryland
National Register of Historic Places in Harford County, Maryland